Jay Odjick is a writer, artist and television producer from the Kitigan Zibi Anishinabeg community in Québec, Canada. He is best known for his creation Kagagi (the raven), part of a growing number of Indigenous superheroes created by Indigenous writers and artists.  In 2015, Kagagi has now moved from the page to the screen in a 13-episode, half-hour animated series broadcast on APTN.

Early life
Born in Rochester, New York, Odjick moved to where his father was from, the Kitigan Zibi Anishinabeg community just outside of Maniwaki, Quebec as a child. Odjick developed an interest in heroes and comic books as a child. He began writing stories at age 5 and received his first rejection letter from a comic publisher, Marvel Comics, at the age of ten.

Career
Odjick began in comics by self publishing a three issue black and white limited series called The Raven that he wrote and illustrated in 2004. Odjick is also the author and artist of the graphic novel Kagagi: The Raven, published by Arcana Studio in 2011. The titular character, Kagagi, is a hero loosely based on the trickster/hero character "Raven" from the Anishinabe. In the comic series, a young man named Matthew Carver inherits supernatural powers and uses them to keep an ancient evil known as Windigo, at bay. A television series based on the graphic novel called Kagagi began airing on Aboriginal Peoples Television Network (APTN) in Canada on October 5, 2014 and later on FNX in the United States. The series is a half-hour animated series produced by Odjick and Arcana's Sean Patrick O'Reilly. Kagagi, according to scholar Michael Sheyashe (Osage) is part of a trend by Native American writers and artists to create relevant heroes that are not confined to the tropes associated with dated stereotypes and romanticism. Odjick uses the character of Kagagi to entertain, but also to teach Anishinaabe culture and language. Odjick's artwork and the Kagagi graphic novel were used as the centerpiece title and branding of Mazinbiige, The Indigenous Graphic Novel Collection, a permanent collection at the Elizabeth Dafoe library at the University of Manitoba.

In 2014, Jay was the Media Guest of Honour at Can-Con: The Conference on Canadian Content in Speculative Arts and Literature.

Jay's story First Hunt from MOONSHOT, named Best Book of 2015 (young adult category) by the School Library Journal, has been added to the curriculum of Queen's University's Comics and Graphic Novels Course, while the collection itself is being taught at the University of Ottawa's Comic Books and Graphic Novels Course.

In 2015, Jay’s work was part of the exhibit "Super Heroes: Art! Action! Adventure!" at the Heard Museum, in Phoenix, Arizona.

In 2017, Jay illustrated a children's book called Blackflies, which was written by the legendary children's author Robert Munsch. In the book, a girl named Helen must save her little sister after she is carried away by blackflies. Odjick and Munsch teamed up once again with the 2019 children's book Bear for Breakfast. In this tale, a boy named Donovan decides to catch a bear to eat for breakfast, just like his grandfather used to. The story came out of a visit that In addition to illustration, Odijick also provided English-Algonquin and French-Algonquin translation.

Television
Odjick serves as the lead writer, executive producer as well as lead designer on the television series Kagagi. In addition to his work on that series Odjick has also worked as a designer for and provided illustrations for the APTN series Mouki.

Odjick and his production company created three audio versions of Kagagi — one in English, one in Algonquin, and a broadcast version — primarily English with 20 per cent of the dialogue in Algonquin.

For Odjick, the goal was to give First Nations children “an entryway into the (Algonquin) language because the language is dying.”

But it’s not just children who are watching the program, it’s older people too.

Odjick explains that an elderly man told him he watches the program every week because, “it’s the only chance I get to hear my language.”

“That kind of broke my heart,” says Odjick.

It also got Odjick thinking about what else he could do.

Publications

Activism
Odjick has been cited for his use of graphic novels and television as modern mediums to facilitate the retention of the Anishinaabe language.

References

 http://www.arcana.com/view_issue.php?id=269
 http://aptn.ca/kagagi/
 http://www.themanitoban.com/2013/11/elizabeth-dafoe-library-houses-extensive-indigenous-graphic-novel-collection/17704/
 http://aptn.ca/mouki/
 Sheyahshe, Michael A. "Native Americans in Comic Books: A critical study". McFarland & Company, Inc. 2008. e-
 http://www.msn.com/en-ca/tv/series/kagagi-the-raven/seasons-episodes/BBbooK
 http://www.blackgate.com/2014/10/04/new-animated-series-about-a-teen-aboriginal-superhero-from-creator-jay-odjick/

Living people
Ojibwe people
Writers from Rochester, New York
People from Outaouais
Year of birth missing (living people)